Mark Russell Turpin (February 4, 1957 – August 6, 2021) was an American professional tennis player.

Turpin, born in Clinton, Oklahoma, was the middle son of Texas Tennis Hall of Fame inductee Jack Turpin and a brother of professional tennis player Jeff Turpin. Raised in Dallas, Turpin was a main draw qualifier for the 1978 US Open and played collegiate tennis for Southern Methodist University, earning All-American honors as a senior in 1979. He competed briefly in professional tennis and had a best singles world ranking of 211.

Grand Prix career finals

Doubles: 2 (0–2)

ATP Challenger finals

Doubles: 1 (0–1)

Personal life
Turpin spent his life post tennis in New Braunfels, Texas. He had four children with wife Kathleen and died in 2021, at the age of 64.

References

External links
 
 

1957 births
2021 deaths
American male tennis players
SMU Mustangs men's tennis players
Tennis players from Dallas